Cladocyclus (derived from the Greek κλάδος/kládos ("branch") and κύκλος/kýklos ("circle")) is an extinct genus of Ichthyodectidae. A new species, Cladocyclus pankowskii, was discovered in the Cenomanian Akfabou Formation of Morocco in 2007, and in the Upper Plattenkalk of Italy. The species Cladocyclus geddesi is known from the Winton Formation of Australia.

Gallery

References 

Ichthyodectiformes
Early Cretaceous fish
Late Cretaceous fish
Albian genus first appearances
Cenomanian genus extinctions
Cretaceous fish of Africa
Cretaceous Morocco
Fossils of Morocco
Cretaceous fish of Europe
Cretaceous Italy
Fossils of Italy
Cretaceous fish of South America
Early Cretaceous animals of South America
Cretaceous Brazil
Fossils of Brazil
Crato Formation
Romualdo Formation
Fossil taxa described in 1843
Taxa named by Louis Agassiz